Vadim Skorovarov (born 4 August 1996) is a Uzbekistani sports shooter. He competed in the men's 10 metre air rifle event at the 2016 Summer Olympics.

References

External links
 

1996 births
Living people
Uzbekistani male sport shooters
Olympic shooters of Uzbekistan
Shooters at the 2016 Summer Olympics
Place of birth missing (living people)
Shooters at the 2014 Summer Youth Olympics
Shooters at the 2014 Asian Games
Shooters at the 2018 Asian Games
Asian Games competitors for Uzbekistan
21st-century Uzbekistani people